In the United Kingdom the Dangerous Drugs Act 1920 is an Act which changed to a penal offence drug addiction which up to then was, within the medical profession, treated as a disease. The former was the view held by the then Assistant Under Secretary of State, Malcolm Delevingne.

The Home Office was charged with implementing the Act. In January 1921 the Home Secretary gave 40 days' notice of his intention to issue controls over: 
raw opium
morphine
cocaine 
ecgonine and
heroin.

The Act also said that the export, import, sale, distribution or possession of barbiturates, had to be licensed or authorised by the Home Secretary. This proviso also applied to dilutions of cocaine and morphine, as defined in the lower limits set by the Hague Convention.

The Home Office, in consultation with the Ministry of Health, as a result of this Act, produced a series of memoranda for doctors and dentists to explain the requirements of the Act. These were known as DD 101's (Memoranda as to the Duties of Doctors and Dentists). These were distributed to doctors, although the memorandi never had any statutory power. One particular memorandum, in 1938, added, for the first time, that maintenance of addicts if only for the 'gratification of addiction is not regarded as a medical need'.

References 

United Kingdom Acts of Parliament 1920
Drug control law in the United Kingdom
English criminal law
Substance dependence